Peter Thalheimer (June 4, 1936-April 17, 2018) was a member of the House of Commons of Canada from 1993 to 1997. He was a lawyer by career, joining the Ontario bar in 1964 after studying at the University of Ottawa.

Thalheimer established a legal practice in Timmins and served as a municipal solicitor there.

He first campaigned for a seat in federal Parliament in the 1988 federal election but lost to NDP candidate Cid Samson at the Timmins—Chapleau electoral district. In the 1993 federal election Thalheimer beat Samson in the riding and served on the 35th Canadian Parliament. After completing his term of office, Thalheimer did not seek re-election in 1997 indicating that his departure from federal politics was due to health problems.

References

External links

1936 births
2018 deaths
Lawyers in Ontario
Liberal Party of Canada MPs
Members of the House of Commons of Canada from Ontario
People from Timmins
People from Unity, Saskatchewan
University of Ottawa alumni